The Gardens Casino is a cardroom casino located in Hawaiian Gardens, California. The casino was founded in 1997 and only offers card games. The casino started with a space of 59,900 square feet. In 2016, the casino underwent a $90 million renovation and expanded to 200,000 square feet.

In 2017, the casino faced a possible loss of license after admitting it failed to follow federal anti-money laundering laws. Keith Sharp, the Gardens Casino’s general counsel, stated managers have taken responsibility for the failure and "have made tremendous steps in improving our programs".

On December 5, 2019 California Attorney General Xavier Becerra announced a $3.1 million settlement with  Hawaiian Gardens Casino for “misleading gambling regulators and violating the Bank Secrecy Act.” The settlement was in addition to the $2.8 million penalty imposed on the casino by the U.S. Treasury Department’s Financial Crimes Enforcement Network. The casino was also required to complete a 24-month compliance period to meet the terms of the settlement. 

The television webcast show, Poker Night in America, has hosted shows at the casino with an upcoming live show set to be broadcast in March 2018.

See also
 List of casinos in California

References

External links

Casinos completed in 1997
1997 establishments in California
Casinos in Los Angeles County, California